F Word or The F Word may refer to:

Any of several words that begins with the letter "f", often used as a euphemism where they may be considered controversial, particularly:
Fuck
 Faggot (slang)

Film and television 
 The F Word (British TV series), a cooking show featuring celebrity chef Gordon Ramsay
 The F Word (American TV series), the U.S. version of the cooking show featuring Gordon Ramsay
 The F Word (2005 film), a film starring Josh Hamilton
 The F Word (2013 film), a film starring Daniel Radcliffe and Zoe Kazan (retitled to What If)
 "The F Word" (South Park), a 2009 episode of the U.S. television series South Park
 "The F Word", an episode from season 4 of the television series Daria

Music 
 "The F-Word", a song by Babybird from Bugged released in 2000
 "The F Word", a song by Cannibal Ox from The Cold Vein released in 2001

Other media 
 The F-Word (blog), a UK-based feminist blog
 The F-Word (book), a 1995 book by Jesse Sheidlower about English usage of the word "fuck" and translations in other languages
 The F-Word, an exhibition exploring personal tales of forgiveness and reconciliation from around the world by UK charity The Forgiveness Project

Other uses 
 FWord pointers, in computer programming